In physics, the principle of locality states that an object is influenced directly only by its immediate surroundings. A theory that includes the principle of locality is said to be a "local theory". This is an alternative to the concept of instantaneous, or "non-local" action at a distance. Locality evolved out of the field theories of classical physics. The idea is that for a cause at one point to have an effect at another point, something in the space between those points must mediate the action. To exert an influence, something, such as a wave or particle, must travel through the space between the two points, carrying the influence.

The special theory of relativity limits the speed at which any such influence can travel to the speed of light, . Therefore, the principle of locality implies that an event at one point cannot cause a simultaneous result at another point.

Bell test experiments show that quantum mechanics broadly violates the inequalities established in Bell's theorem. According to some interpretations of quantum mechanics, this result implies that some quantum effects must be non-local.

Pre-quantum mechanics 

During the 17th century Newton's principle of universal gravitation was formulated in terms of "action at a distance", thereby violating the principle of locality. 

Coulomb's law of electric forces was initially also formulated as instantaneous action at a distance, but was later superseded by Maxwell's equations of electromagnetism, which obey locality.

In 1905 Albert Einstein's special theory of relativity postulated that no material or energy can travel faster than the speed of light, and Einstein thereby sought to reformulate physics in a way that obeyed the principle of locality. He later succeeded in producing an alternative theory of gravitation, general relativity, which obeys the principle of locality.

However, a different challenge to the principle of locality developed subsequently from the theory of quantum mechanics, which Einstein himself had helped to create.

Quantum mechanics

Local realism 

In 1935, Albert Einstein, Boris Podolsky and Nathan Rosen in their EPR paradox theorised that quantum mechanics might not be a local theory, because a measurement made on one of a pair of separated but entangled particles causes a simultaneous effect, the collapse of the wave function, in the remote particle (i.e., an effect exceeding the speed of light). In 1964 John Stewart Bell formulated the "Bell inequality", which, if violated in actual experiments, implies that quantum mechanics violates local realism, i.e. the intersection of locality and realism. Realism refers to another principle, which relates to the value of unmeasured quantities before measurement (counterfactual definiteness).

Experimental tests of the Bell inequality, beginning with John Clauser and Alain Aspect's 1980s experiments, showed that quantum mechanics violates the inequality, so it must violate at least one of the assumptions of local realism. However, critics have noted these experiments included "loopholes", which prevented a definitive answer to this question. This problem is considered to have been resolved during 2015 when three "loophole-free" experiments were carried out In 2015 by independent groups in Delft University of Technology, University of Vienna and National Institute of Standards and Technology (NIST), addressing multiple loopholes at the same time. However, some loopholes might persist, like superdeterminism, with the result that the question may be fundamentally untestable.

Because of the probabilistic nature of wave function collapse, this violation of local realism cannot be used to transmit information faster than light, in accordance to the no communication theorem.

Relativistic quantum mechanics 
Locality is one of the axioms of relativistic quantum field theory, as required for causality. The formalization of locality in this case is as follows: if there are two observables, each localized within two distinct spacetime regions which happen to be at a spacelike separation from each other, the observables must commute. Alternatively, a solution to the field equations is local if the underlying equations are either Lorentz invariant or, more generally, generally covariant or locally Lorentz invariant.

See also 
 Einstein's thought experiments
 Local hidden-variable theory
 Non-locality (disambiguation)
 Quantum nonlocality
 Cluster decomposition

References

External links 

 Quantum nonlocality vs. Einstein locality by H. Dieter Zeh

Quantum measurement